On November 4, 2008, the District of Columbia held a U.S. House of Representatives election for its shadow representative. Unlike its non-voting delegate, the shadow representative is only recognized by the district and is not officially sworn or seated. Incumbent Shadow Representative Mike Panetta won election to a second term.

Primary elections
Primary elections were held on September 9, 2008

Democratic primary

Candidates
 Mike Panetta, incumbent Shadow Representative

Results

Statehood Green primary
 Joyce Robinson-Paul, perennial candidate

Results

Other primaries
A Republican primary was held but no candidates filed and only 248 write-in votes were cast.

General election
The general election took place on November 4, 2008.

Results

References

Washington, D.C., Shadow Representative elections
2008 elections in Washington, D.C.